Patrick Roux (born 29 April 1962) is a French judoka. He competed in the men's extra-lightweight event at the 1988 Summer Olympics.

References

External links
 

1962 births
Living people
French male judoka
Olympic judoka of France
Judoka at the 1988 Summer Olympics
Place of birth missing (living people)